Humphrey Patrick O'Neill (1925 - 9 February 1976) was an Irish Gaelic footballer who played for club sides Clonakilty, University College Cork and at inter-county level with the Cork senior football team.

Career

O'Neill first came to Gaelic football prominence as a member of the Clonakilty club that was enjoying a golden age in terms of success. He became a regular member of the club's senior team in 1944 and won four County Championship titles in nine seasons. O'Neill was drafted onto the Cork senior football team for the 1945 Munster final, a decision which was criticised due to his relative youth and inexperience, however, he ended the game with his first winners' medal. He ended the season by lining out at centre-forward when Cork claimed the All-Ireland title after a defeat of Cavan in the final. O'Neill won a second Munster Championship medal as a substitute in 1949. He returned to the team for one final season as captain in 1953.

Personal life and death

O'Neill married Catherine M. "Ina" Sheehy in Cork in 1951. The couple later relocated to Ballsbridge in Dublin and had six children. His nephew, Dave McCarthy, won an All-Ireland medal with Cork in 1973. O'Neill died after a brief period of illness at Mercer's Hospital on 9 February 1976.

Honours

Clonakilty
Cork Senior Football Championship: 1944, 1946, 1947, 1952

Cork
All-Ireland Senior Football Championship: 1945
Munster Senior Football Championship: 1945, 1949

References

1925 births
1976 deaths
Clonakilty Gaelic footballers
UCC Gaelic footballers
Cork inter-county Gaelic footballers